Charlie Hebdo issue  1011 is an issue of the French satirical newspaper Charlie Hebdo published on 2 November 2011.  Several attacks against Charlie Hebdo, including an arson attack at its headquarters, were motivated by the issue's cover caricature of Muhammad, whose depiction is prohibited in some interpretations of Islam.  The issue's subtitle Charia Hebdo references Islamic sharia law.

Charia Hebdo
On 31 October 2011, issue No. 1011 of the satirical French newspaper Charlie Hebdo left the presses two days before its official publication date.  The issue was retitled Charia Hebdo in facetious celebration of Tunisian Islamist party Ennahdha's election victory.  It elicited mixed reactions in social media.  Muhammad, the founder of Islam, appears on the cover saying, "100 lashes if you do not die laughing!" in a caricature by cartoonist Luz.

The issue announced, "To fittingly celebrate the victory of the Islamist Ennahda party in Tunisia ... Charlie Hebdo has asked Muhammad to be the special editor-in-chief of its next issue", the magazine said in a statement  ... The prophet of Islam didn't have to be asked twice and we thank him for it."  It featured an editorial purportedly by Muhammad "Halal Aperitif" and a women's supplement called "Madam Sharia". 110,000 copies were sold of the issue on its day of publication and its management announced a reprinting.

Attacks

Arson at the Charlie Hebdo offices

During the night of 1 November 2011 the Charlie Hebdo offices at 62 boulevard Davout in the 20th arrondissement of Paris were burned down with a Molotov cocktail.  Patrick Pelloux, who writes a column for the weekly, announced that "everything was destroyed".  Charlie Hebdo management said the fire was related to the publication of Charia Hebdo, and added they had "received quite a few letters of protest, threats, and insults on Twitter and Facebook".

Nicolas Demorand, the managing editor of the newspaper Libération, invited the Charlie Hebdo staff to set themselves up in the Libération offices.  The following day, a four-page supplement dedicated to the cartoons of Charlie Hebdo appeared in Libération.

On 3 November, Charlie Hebdos manager Charb, managing editor Riss, and cartoonist Luz were placed under police protection.

Cracking of the Charlie Hebdo website
Charlie Hebdos website was hacked twice on the day of the issue's publication.  The welcome page was replaced by a message in English and Turkish saying, "You keep abusing Islam's almighty Prophet with disgusting and disgraceful cartoons using excuses of freedom of speech. ... Be God's Curse On You!  We will be Your Curse on Cyber World!"

The following day the Turkish hacker group Akıncılar took credit for the attack.  The group targets publications that it believes attacks its values or that it deems "pornographic or Satanic".  The group asserted it had nothing to do with the burning of the Charlie Hebdo offices, and that it did not support acts of violence.

On 3 November, the company Bluevision, which hosted the site, refused to put it back online following death threats it received.  The following day Charlie Hebdo began a blog at charliehebdo.wordpress.com.

Threats on the Charlie Hebdo Facebook page
Facebook suspended Charlie Hebdos page on the site after users left numerous threatening messages on it.  Facebook's official explanation was that Charlie Hebdo was not an actual person, and that the page contravened rules proscribing graphic content.

2015 terrorist attack

On 7 January 2015, two Islamist terrorists stormed the Charlie Hebdo offices and killed twelve.  Afterwards, they reportedly declared, "We have avenged the Prophet Muhammad. We have killed  Charlie Hebdo!"  Among the victims were cartoonists Cabu, Charb, Honoré, Tignous, Georges Wolinski, and the economist Bernard Maris.

See also
 Charlie Hebdo issue No. 1178
Islam in France

References

Charlie Hebdo
2011 in Paris
2011 works
Attacks in Europe in 2011
Cultural depictions of Muhammad
Events relating to freedom of expression
History of Paris
Individual issues of periodicals
Islamic terrorism in France
Freedom of the press in France
Newspapers published in France
Blasphemy